Mouhot's litter frog (Leptobrachium mouhoti;) is a species of frog in the family Megophryidae. It is endemic to Vietnam and eastern Cambodia. However, its taxonomic relationship with Leptobrachium pullum, and possible occurrence in Vietnam, is unclear.

Range
It is known from:
Quang Nam Province, Vietnam
Quang Ngai Province, Vietnam
Mondulkiri Province, Cambodia
Ratanakiri Province, Cambodia

In Cambodia, it is known from Keo Seima Wildlife Sanctuary, Phnom Nam Lyr Wildlife Sanctuary, and Virachey National Park.

References

mouhoti
Amphibians of Cambodia
Endemic fauna of Cambodia
Amphibians described in 2006